Fishbone and the Familyhood Nextperience Present: The Friendliest Psychosis of All is a three-song EP released by alternative rock band Fishbone in 2002. It features original outtakes from their 2000 album Fishbone and the Familyhood Nextperience Present: The Psychotic Friends Nuttwerx, with cameos from funk pioneer George Clinton, Primus bass guitarist Les Claypool and comedic singer Blowfly.

The final track is a 21-minute spoken word jam led by saxophonist Angelo Moore.

Track listing

Personnel
Angelo Moore - saxophone, vocals
Walter A. Kibby II - trumpet, vocals
Buckethead - guitar
Spacey T - guitar
John McKnight - keyboard, trombone, guitar
John Norwood Fisher - bass guitar
John Steward - drums

References

2002 EPs
Fishbone albums